Rhododendrin (betuloside)  is an arylbutanoid glycoside and a phenylpropanoid, a type of natural phenol. It can be found in the leaves of Rhododendron aureum or in Cistus salviifolius.

In vitro, it shows analgesic, anti-inflammatory and diuretic properties.

References 

Phenylpropanoids
Rhododendron